The 1979 Bendel State gubernatorial election occurred on July 28, 1979. UPN's Ambrose Alli won election for a first term to become Bendel State's first executive governor leading and defeating main opposition in the contest.

Electoral system
The Governor of Bendel State is elected using the plurality voting system.

Results
There were five political parties registered by the Federal Electoral Commission (FEDECO) participated in the elections. Ambrose Folorunsho Alli of the NPN won the contest by polling the highest votes.

References 

Bendel State gubernatorial election
Bendel State gubernatorial elections
July 1979 events in Nigeria